is a town and port in Shōzu District, Kagawa, Japan, with a population of 12,915. The town lies on the west coast of the island of Shōdoshima—the second-largest island in the Seto Inland Sea—and it is the main passenger access for the island. First settled around the 8th century, the town center grew into a complex maze of streets during the war-torn Muromachi period (1336–1573) to inhibit enemy forces. The town was officially incorporated in 1898, and today sesame oil, olives, sōmen noodles, fishing and tourism are important industries.

The town's jurisdiction totals 74.38 km², covering historic Tonoshō and smaller settlements on western Shōdoshima, as well as Teshima, Odeshima, and other nearby islands.

The town is known as the setting of the manga and anime Teasing Master Takagi-san and is the creator's hometown. Tonoshō also participates in the regional Setouchi Triennale art festival, and several art installations are found in the area.

Notable locations 
Modern Tonoshō includes all of western Shodoshima, Teshima, and surrounding islands.
 Angel Road, a 500-meter-long sandbar that appears during low tide, connecting Shodoshima with a series of small islets
Chōshi Gorge
Dofuchi Strait, the narrowest strait in the world
Teshima, a large island to the west

Notable people 

 Sōichirō Yamamoto, a Japanese manga artist and the creator of Teasing Master Takagi-san

Gallery

References

External links
 Angel Road - GaijinPot Travel
 Notable Locations in Karakai Jouzu no Takagi-san (in Japanese)
  (in Japanese)

Towns in Kagawa Prefecture